Eadweard Muybridge, Zoopraxographer is a 1975 student documentary film directed by Thom Andersen about the English photographer Eadweard Muybridge.

Legacy
In 2015, the United States Library of Congress selected the film for preservation in the National Film Registry, finding it "culturally, historically, or aesthetically significant". Newly restored by the UCLA Film & Television Archive, it was released on home video in 2016 by Cinema Guild.

Cast
 Eadweard Muybridge as Himself
 Dean Stockwell as Narrator

See also
 List of American films of 1975
 Eadweard (film)
 Los Angeles Plays Itself

References

External links

Eadweard Muybridge, Zoopraxographer essay by Joseph Sgammato at Senses of Cinema

1975 films
1975 documentary films
American documentary films
Films directed by Thom Andersen
Documentary films about photographers
United States National Film Registry films
Essays about film
American student films
1970s English-language films
1970s American films